The 1968 Los Angeles Rams season was the team's 31st year with the National Football League and the 23rd season in Los Angeles. The season saw the Rams attempting to improve on their 11-1-2 record from 1967 and qualifying for the playoffs for the second straight season. The Rams started off by winning their first six games before losing to the Baltimore Colts for their first loss. After 2 more victories, the Rams tied the San Francisco 49ers. They rebounded by winning their next 2 games and were in firm control of their playoff hopes. However, 2 close losses to the Chicago Bears and Baltimore Colts at home dampened their playoff hopes, and they barely missed the playoffs as a result.

Roster

Season Recap

Just as they had in 1967, the Rams and Colts staged a season long battle for the Coastal Division title. The Rams won their first six games, but lost to the Colts in Baltimore in week seven, 27-10, to fall into a tie with the Colts. Both teams won their next two games, but then the Rams had to rally from a 10-point 4th quarter deficit to tie the 49ers in San Francisco, 20-20.

Going into the second to the last game of the season against the Bears, the Rams trailed the Colts by 1/2 game, with a regular season finale vs. the Colts in Los Angeles looming the following week to decide the title. The Colts won a Saturday game in Green Bay (eliminating the Packers from playoff contention) 16-3.  On Sunday, the Bears, the breaks, and the officials all played a role in the Bears 17-16 win that eliminated the Rams. The Bears played inspired defense, even knocking quarterback Roman Gabriel out of the game for a time. The Rams blocked a Bears punt, but it rolled out of the end zone for a safety just before the Rams were about to recover the ball in the end zone for a touchdown. Finally, trailing by a point, Gabriel rallied the Rams and appeared to pass them into field goal range. But a late flag for clipping cost the Rams the gain and set them back 15 yards into their own territory. At the same time, the officials neglected to re-set the down marker back to 3rd down (the down is supposed to go over on a penalty), so when the next play was an incomplete pass, the officials awarded the Bears the ball. The Rams protested vehemently that it was still their ball down but to no avail. The NFL later acknowledged the officials' mistake but said the result of the game could not be changed.

Schedule

Standings

References

Los Angeles Rams
Los Angeles Rams seasons
Los Angeles Rams